Queen Fu (personal name unknown) was a queen of the Xianbei-led Chinese Western Qin dynasty. Her husband was Qifu Gangui (King Wuyuan).

She was a younger sister of the Former Qin emperor Fu Deng (Emperor Gao), and he created her Princess Dongping.  In 394, with his forces having been nearly wiped out by the rival Later Qin's emperor Yao Xing, Fu Deng sought aid from Western Qin, and as part of the agreement, married her to Qifu Gangui.  However, later that year, Fu Deng was captured and killed by Yao Xing.  Subsequently, Qifu Gangui, notwithstanding the marital relations, expelled Fu Deng's son and successor Fu Chong, who then tried to attack Qifu Gangui but was defeated and killed in battle, ending Former Qin.  No further reference was made to Queen Fu, and since his first wife Queen Bian was the one mentioned as being created queen after he lost his state to Later Qin but reestablished in 409, the table below assumes that she was deposed, and Queen Bian restored, after Former Qin's destruction.

Western Qin queens
Former Qin people
4th-century Chinese women
4th-century Chinese people
Year of birth missing
Year of death missing